The 2000 United States Senate election in Connecticut took place on November 7, 2000 in conjunction with the 2000 U.S. presidential election, other elections to the United States Senate in other states, as well as elections to the United States House of Representatives and various state and local elections. Incumbent Democratic U.S. Senator Joe Lieberman won re-election to a third term.

While running for re-election to the Senate, Lieberman was also the Democratic nominee for vice president in the concurrent presidential election, running with presidential nominee Al Gore. With Gore losing the presidency to George W. Bush, Lieberman returned to the Senate and remained there for another 12 years, when he retired. Had the Gore-Lieberman ticket won, Lieberman would have become vice president and resigned his Senate seat, which would have led to a 2002 special election. It would also have led Republican Governor John G. Rowland to temporarily appoint an interim replacement.

This is the last Senate election in which Lieberman formally ran as a Democrat. In 2006, his last election prior to retirement, he ran as an independent Democrat.

General election

Candidates
Joe Lieberman (D), incumbent U.S. senator since 1989
Philip Giordano (R), Mayor of Waterbury and former State Representative
Wildey J. Moore (L)
William Kozak, Jr. (CCP)

Campaign
Lieberman, a popular centrist incumbent, focused on his vice presidential campaign. He refused to attend any debates. Giordano was a heavy underdog, as he was ignored by the press and he debated alone.

Results

See also 
 2000 United States Senate elections

References

Connecticut
2000
United States Senate
Joe Lieberman